Bedford Baptist Church (also known as Old Bedford Baptist Church or Bedford Community Building) is a historic church built in a Gothic Revival style.  The church currently serves as a community building for the city. It was built in 1893, and added to the National Register in 2002.

References

Baptist churches in Ohio
Churches on the National Register of Historic Places in Ohio
Bedford, Ohio
Gothic Revival church buildings in Ohio
Churches completed in 1893
19th-century Baptist churches in the United States
Churches in Cuyahoga County, Ohio
National Register of Historic Places in Cuyahoga County, Ohio